Glucuronidase may refer to several enzymes:

 Alpha-glucuronidase
 Beta-glucuronidase
 Glycyrrhizinate beta-glucuronidase
 Glucuronosyl-disulfoglucosamine glucuronidase